Broomieknowe Golf Club is a parkland golf club in Bonnyrigg, Midlothian, Scotland.

History 
The golf club was formed in 1905 with the golf course opening in April 1906. The original course was designed by North Berwick professional golfer Ben Sayers, consisting of 18 holes and measuring 4740 yards. In 1933, golf course architect and professional James Braid redesigned the course to take advantage of new land, and extended the length to 5826 yards. The James Braid design lasted until the late 1980s, when the course undertook significant restructuring as a result of the extension of the A7 road between Edinburgh at the Scottish Borders. The new course opened in 1995 measuring 6150 yards.

Scorecard 
The current course has a standard scratch of 70 with a competition standard scratch of 69.

References 
Knowles, Philip (2005) Broomieknowe Century - A History of Broomieknowe Golf Club Founded 1905. Broomieknowe Golf Club.

External links 
Broomieknowe GC Official Website
UK Golf Guide (Broomieknowe Page)

Golf clubs and courses in Midlothian
Sport in Midlothian
Sports venues in Midlothian
1905 establishments in Scotland
Sports venues completed in 1905
Organisations based in Midlothian
Bonnyrigg and Lasswade